Mustapha Ahmad Isa is an Academician and is the 2nd substantive Vice chancellor of Yusuf Maitama Sule University, Kano. Mustapha served for good five year 2015 to 2020 who was succeeded by Professor Mukhtar Atiku Kurawa.

Early life and education
Mustapha was born in May 1965 at Yola Quarters, a local government in Kano State, Nigeria. He started his primary education at Shahuci primary school (1977). He attended Yolawa Union School and got his Islamiyya certificate there.
Mohammed got his B.A in Hausa Language (1987) from Bayero University, Kano.
He got Masters (1990) and Doctorate degree (1994) at Indiana University, Bloomington, Indiana, USA, with a minor and major in applied English and theoretical linguistic respectively.

Career
Mustapha is a Professor of English language.
He has served as Director of Academic planning as well as member of Governing council at Bayero University, Kano.

Publications
Mustapha has various publications which he authored and co-authored.

References

Vice-Chancellors of Nigerian universities
Linguists from Nigeria
Bayero University Kano alumni
Indiana University Bloomington alumni
People from Kano State
Living people
1965 births